Hava Pinhas-Cohen (18 January 1955 – 29 October 2022) was an Israeli writer and poet.

Early life
Hava Pinhas-Cohen was born to a Jewish family of Bulgarian immigrants in 1955. Her family fled the European continent in the aftermath of World War II. They found a new life in Israel. Pinhas-Cohen was the first in her family to be born in the state of Israel.

According to Yaniv Hagbi, in a comment translated from Hebrew to English, "Her experiences, the state of Israel, Judaism, eroticism, and the Tanakh are remarkably woven together in the tapestry of her work." Pinchas-Cohen and her four daughters lived in Jerusalem.

Job background
Pinhas-Cohen was a poet, editor and a lecturer of literature and art. In 1989 she founded and edited the Jewish literature, art and culture journal Dimui. "Her poems have been translated and appear in various anthologies in English, French, Serbian-Croatian, Chinese, Greek, and Spanish." Some of her works are Mostly Color, Journey of the Doe, River and Forgetfulness, Orphea’s Poems The Gardener, the Bitch and the Slut, A school of one man, and My Brother, the thirst. In 2007 she founded and became the Artistic Director of Kisufim, a conference of Jewish writers. It has had three successful festivals, the years being 2007, 2009 and 2013.

Later life and death
Hava Pinhas-Cohen studied Hebrew literature and art history at the Hebrew University of Jerusalem. She taught literature and written proficiency in high school for many years, and developed a special method of integrating literature, Bible, visual arts and cinema. From 1990, she was the Editor-in-Chief of Dimui, a journal of literature, criticism and Jewish culture. She was also a book reviewer, translator, and columnist for the daily newspaper Maariv.

Pinhas-Cohen died on 29 October 2022, at the age of 67.

Works of literature
Dimui
Mostly Color
Journey of the Doe
River and Forgetfulness
Orphea’s Poems 
The Gardener, the Bitch and the Slut
A School of One Man
My Brother, the Thirst

Awards and recognition
 Prime Minister's Prize (1996)
 The ACUM Prize (1998)
 The Kugel Prize (Haim Kugel Literary Award of the Municipality of Holon; 2000)
 The Alterman Prize (2002)
 The Ramat Gan Prize (2013)
 The Rishon LeZion Prize for Creativity in Hebrew Language (2015)
 The Dr Gardner Simon Prize for Hebrew Poetry (2022)

See also
 Ada Aharoni
 Karen Alkalay-Gut
 Raquel Chalfi
 Janice Rebibo
 Naomi Shemer
 Yona Wallach
 Zelda (poet)

References

Sources

1955 births
2022 deaths
Israeli women poets
Israeli poets
Israeli editors
Israeli women editors
Hebrew University of Jerusalem alumni
Israeli people of Bulgarian-Jewish descent
Jewish women writers
Israeli Jews